Hypera Pharma (formerly known as Hypermarcas) is a Brazilian multinational pharmaceutical 
company headquartered in São Paulo. It is the Brazilian largest pharmaceutical company by market capitalization. The company was formerly known as Hypermarcas, before a corporate name change that was announced in December 2017. The company was rebranded as Hypera in 2018.

Hypera Pharma's main market segments are Consumer Health, Branded Prescription and Branded Generics.

References

External links
 Hypera Pharma

Conglomerate companies of Brazil
Manufacturing companies based in São Paulo
Pharmaceutical companies of Brazil
Companies listed on B3 (stock exchange)
Brazilian brands